Robert Edwin Smalley (1867 – 1947) was an English footballer who played in the Football League for Everton.

Early career
Robert Smalley was signed by Preston North End in 1886. In the following year, May 1887, he moved to Everton and took over as No: 1 Goalkeeper from Charles Jolliffe and his Everton debut was made in October 1887 against Notts County. He played 30 matches before the Football League started in September 1888. He was described as an agile goalkeeper and was Everton' No: 1 for the next two seasons.

1888-1889 Season
Robert Smalley made his League Debut on 8 September 1888, playing as goalkeeper, at Anfield, then home of Everton. The home team defeated the visitors, Accrington 2–1. Robert Smalley appeared in 18 of the 22 League games played by Everton in season 1888–89. As a goalkeeper (18 appearances) he played in an Everton defence that kept two clean sheets and restricted the opposition to one–League–goal–in–a–match on five separate occasions.

1889 onwards
Smalley was retained for 1889-1890 and played 17 matches. His last season, 1890-1891 he only played once. After football he became an accountant and went back to Preston.

References

1867 births
1947 deaths
English footballers
Everton F.C. players
English Football League players
Association football goalkeepers